Thorvald Ellegaard (7 March 1877 - 27 April 1954) was a leading Danish track racing cyclist in the 1900s and 1910s. He won the world professional sprint title six times, three European titles, and 24 Danish titles. Over the course of his long career, which spanned 31 years, he competed in 1,560 significant races, winning 925 of them. He was Denmark's first sports idol.

Biography
Thorvald Kristian Kristensen was born on 7 March 1877 in Fangel, a village 12 km south-west of Odense on the Danish island of Funen. He had his debut on 23 May 1895 in Slagelse. Like his brother, Peter, he changed his name to Ellegård after the farm where they were born. He completed a mason's apprenticeship in 1896.

In 1898 he became professional as the first Danish racing cyclist from the provinces. By 1899, the international community had become aware of his talent and started speculating that he could become the next big star. In 1901 he won both the world championship in sprint and the prestigious Grand Prix de la Ville de Paris. Over the following decade, Ellegård remained the world's leading racing cyclist.

From 1912 Ellegård took up permanent residence with his family in Paris so that his daughter, France Ellegård, could complete her training as a pianist. He participated in his last race on 26 September 1926 at the age of 49. He died on 27 April 1954 and is interred at Søllerød cemetery.

See also
 UCI Track Cycling World Championships – Men's sprint
 Sports in Denmark

References

1877 births
1954 deaths
Danish male cyclists
UCI Track Cycling World Champions (men)
People from Odense Municipality
Danish track cyclists
Sportspeople from the Region of Southern Denmark